Narva-Jõesuu is an urban municipality of Estonia, in Ida-Viru County. It comprises the town of Narva-Jõesuu, settlements of the former parish of Vaivara, and two former distant exclaves (the oil shale mining settlements Sirgala and Viivikonna) of the urban municipality of Kohtla-Järve. The municipality surrounds two exclave neighbourhoods (dacha districts) of the city of Narva, Olgina and Kudruküla, both of which share their names with an adjacent village in Narva-Jõesuu municipality.

Settlements
town
Narva-Jõesuu

boroughs
Sinimäe – Olgina

villages
Arumäe – Auvere – Hiiemetsa – Hundinurga – Laagna – Kudruküla – Meriküla – Mustanina – Peeterristi – Perjatsi – Pimestiku – Puhkova – Sirgala – Soldina – Sõtke– Tõrvajõe – Udria – Vaivara – Viivikonna – Vodava.

Symbols
Narva-Jõesuu's flag and coat of arms were designed and approved in the mid-1990s by the chairman of the local government Pavel Grigorjev. The gold strips of land on the image symbolise Estonian and Russian coasts on both sides along the Narva River and the blue area symbolises its iconic mouth.

Twinnings

 Billund Municipality, Denmark
 Imatra, Finland
 Kronstadt, Russia

References

External links

Ida-Viru County
Municipalities of Estonia